is a puzzle video game developed by Nintendo Software Technology and published by Nintendo for the Nintendo 3DS and Wii U. It is the sixth game in the Mario vs. Donkey Kong series, and the 200th ever video game featuring Mario. The title was released worldwide in March 2015 on the Nintendo eShop for all regions, except in Japan. This is the first Nintendo-published title to support a cross-purchase concept, and the first Nintendo 3DS title to support Miiverse stamps. If players buy one version, they receive a free download code for the other version.

Gameplay

The game returns to the two-dimensional side view of the first Mario vs. Donkey Kong game. The player must guide marching toy characters to the end of each level by connecting vertices with lines drawn on either the 3DS touchscreen or Wii U GamePad to create ramps or bridges to help the toys cross gaps or avoid hazards. Every last level has a Cursed Mini Mario. The player will need to guide the marching toy character to Cursed Mini Mario as Cursed Mini Mario can't enter the Goal Door.

Development and release
A Mario vs. Donkey Kong tech demo was revealed at Game Developers Conference in March 2014 to show off the Nintendo Web Framework, a set of tools for developers to make Wii U games with common simple programming languages such as HTML5. In Nintendo's pre-Electronic Entertainment Expo 2014 Digital Event video presentation, the game was confirmed to release on Wii U in 2015. Nintendo announced the final title, release dates, and confirming the Nintendo 3DS version in a January 2015 Nintendo Direct presentation, and that the game would support both cross-platform play and cross-buy concepts. The game came in physical optical discs and 3DS game cards in Japan, and whilst Wii U and Nintendo 3DS game cases were available at retail in Europe, they did not include physical media, but rather a printed download code to be used in the respective Nintendo eShop.

Reception

Tipping Stars received mixed-to-positive reviews, with an aggregate Metacritic score of 70/100 for the Wii U version. IGN gave the game a 6.8/10, praising the challenge of the game and large amount of content, but complained about the lack of new ideas. EGM also criticized the lack of innovation, but concluded their interview by stating that "[if] more of that solid, simple, and fun formula is what you want more of, well⁠—Tipping Stars is just that."

Notes

References

2015 video games
Donkey Kong platform games
Nintendo 3DS eShop games
Nintendo 3DS games
Nintendo Network games
Video game sequels
Video games about toys
Video games developed in the United States
Video games with user-generated gameplay content
Wii U games
Wii U eShop games
Mario vs. Donkey Kong
Video games scored by James Phillipsen